Dessoff is a surname. Notable people with the surname include:

Felix Otto Dessoff (1835–1892), German conductor and composer
Margarete Dessoff (1874–1944), German choral conductor, singer, and voice teacher

See also 
Dessoff Choirs, is an independent chorus based in New York City